Andy Bellatti (born May 29, 1982 Buenos Aires, Argentina) is a Las Vegas-based nutritionist who approaches nutrition from a whole-foods, plant-centric framework. He also takes a strong interest in food politics, nutrition policy, and deceptive food industry marketing tactics. He also frequently discusses the close relationship between the food industry and the Academy of Nutrition and Dietetics.

Bellatti has contributed to a variety of blogs and websites, including "Mrs. Q"'s Fed Up With Lunch, Vegan.com, and Robyn Webb's Fabulous Food Finds

Notes

References 
Andy on Fed Up with Lunch
Andy on Vegan.com
Andy on Robyn Webb's Fabulous Food Finds
Dietitians for Professional Integrity

External links 

Andy Bellatti's SmallBites Blog

1982 births
Living people
Argentine journalists
Male journalists
People from Buenos Aires